Guilherme de Jesus da Silva (born 1 September 1993), commonly known as Tinga, is a Brazilian professional footballer who plays as a right back for Fortaleza.

Club career
In August 2014, Tinga was loaned by Grêmio to Série B side Boa Esporte to gain experience until the end of the Brazilian season. He made his debut for the new club on 27 August, in a 2–0 home win against Icasa.

Career statistics

Honours

Club
Fortaleza
Campeonato Cearense: 2015, 2019, 2020, 2021, 2022
Campeonato Brasileiro Série B: 2018
Copa do Nordeste: 2019, 2022

International
Brazil U20
Toulon Tournament: 2013

References

External links
Tinga profile. Portal Oficial do Grêmio.

1993 births
Living people
Footballers from Porto Alegre
People from Porto Alegre
Brazilian footballers
Association football defenders
Campeonato Brasileiro Série A players
Campeonato Brasileiro Série B players
Campeonato Brasileiro Série C players
Grêmio Foot-Ball Porto Alegrense players
Boa Esporte Clube players
Fortaleza Esporte Clube players
Esporte Clube Bahia players
Esporte Clube Juventude players
Footballers at the 2015 Pan American Games
Pan American Games bronze medalists for Brazil
Pan American Games medalists in football
Medalists at the 2015 Pan American Games